Vadakkumthala  is a village in Kollam district in the state of Kerala, India. Vadakkumthala is coming under the Kollam UA.

Demographics - Census Data 2011

References

 http://www.census2011.co.in/data/town/628370-vadakkumthala-kerala.html

Villages in Kollam district